Ridgmount Street is a street in Bloomsbury, London.

Location
Ridgmount Street runs from Chenies Street in the north to Store Street in the south. It runs parallel with Gower Street and Alfred Place. Ridgmount Place joins Ridgmount Street on its western side.

Occupants and buildings

The street is home to:
Chartered Institute of Library and Information Professionals (CILIP) at number 7; the building was purpose-built in 1965 as the headquarters of the Library Association, one of CILIP's predecessors.
Institute for Fiscal Studies at number 7.
The Child and Family Practice at number 8.
The former Bloomsbury Petrol Station at the south end of the street was the subject of an award-winning redevelopment.

The Polyclinic
At number 22 Chenies Street, on the north western corner of Ridgmount Street, once stood the Medical Graduates' College and Polyclinic. It has since been replaced by Nicholas Cooper House, owned by the Royal Academy of Dramatic Art. The Polyclinic was the first British postgraduate medical institution.

References

Streets in the London Borough of Camden
Bedford Estate